Louis "L. M." Wells (February 5, 1862 – January 1, 1923) was an American actor of the silent film era. A tall, robust actor who was nicknamed "Daddy," L. M. appeared in 51 films between 1912 and 1922 — many of which were Universal westerns — and often was cast as a butler.

Biography 
L. M. was born in Cincinnati, Ohio, and attended Miami University. Before becoming an actor, he dabbled as a journalist, poet, and short story writer. He was around 50 in 1912 when he appeared in So Near, Yet So Far, his first credited on-screen role. As a player for Universal, he appeared in several dozen films between 1912 and 1920. He died in Los Angeles on January 1, 1923, and was survived by his wife, Hallie Price.

Selected filmography
 So Near, Yet So Far (1912)
 Graft (1915)
 As It Happened (1915)
 The Way Out (1915)
 Behind the Lines (1916)
 Liberty (1916)
 The Voice on the Wire (1917)
 A Wife on Trial (1917)
 Treason (1917)
 The Girl Who Won Out (1917)
 Bucking Broadway (1917)
 Man and Beast (1917)
 Like Wildfire (1917)
 The Red Ace (1917)
 Thieves' Gold (1918) - Mr. Savage
 Huckleberry Finn (1920)
 Vanishing Trails (1920)
 Runnin' Straight (1920)

External links

References 

1862 births
1923 deaths
Male actors from Cincinnati
American male film actors
American male silent film actors
20th-century American male actors